Edith King (1896– February 24, 1973) was an American stage and film actress.

Biography
Edith King was born Edith Keck, daughter of John Keck, in White Haven, Pennsylvania in 1896. She first visited a theater when she was 14, and decided then to pursue an acting career. She moved to New York City at a young age and promptly arranged a meeting with David Belasco, who gave her a part in his current play, Marie Odile.

In later life, King lived in Kendall Park, New Jersey, where she owned a small gift shop while continuing her acting career. In 1972 King moved from Riviera Beach to Daytona Beach, where she died on February 24, 1973.

Career
King was known as a stage and film actress, with a career spanning over 50 years (from roughly 1916 to 1964). Before her stage career took off, she was an artist's model, working with Howard Chandler Christy for several of his paintings and illustrations. She appeared in theatrical productions such as Bab (playing the older sister of Helen Hayes's main character) and Thank You, and films such as Saratoga. She worked with Alfred Lunt and his wife in several productions, including The Seagull (as Polina) and The Taming of the Shrew (as the minor characters Curtis and the widow).

She played Bianca in Paul Robeson's 1943 production of Othello before taking over the role of Emilia in 1944 (replacing Margaret Webster).

Filmography

References

External links
 Photographs of Edith King in her role as "Mrs. Smith" in Calcutta with monkey and without monkey from the J. Willis Sayre Collection of Theatrical Photographs 
 Photographs of Edith King by the White Studio and Billy Rose digitized by the New York Public Library
 "Hot Water Is Beauty's Aid, Says Edith King" (Bismarck Tribune, 1922)
 Edith King's IMDb listing

1896 births
1973 deaths
20th-century American actresses
People from Luzerne County, Pennsylvania
People from South Brunswick, New Jersey
People from Riviera Beach, Florida
People from Daytona Beach, Florida
20th-century American women
20th-century American people